The 2004 Bofrost Cup on Ice was held in Gelsenkirchen from November 26 and 28. Medals were awarded in the disciplines of men's singles, ladies' singles, pair skating, and ice dancing. It was part of the ISU Grand Prix of Figure Skating series from its inception until 2003, when it was replaced by Cup of China. Instead of a short program, singles and pairs perform a jumping and required elements contest, followed then by the free skating. Ice dancers perform their original and free dances.

Results

Men

Ladies

Pairs

Ice dancing

References

External links
 2004 Bofrost Cup on Ice

Bofrost Cup On Ice, 2004
Bofrost Cup on Ice